The following are the national records in Olympic weightlifting in El Salvador. Records are maintained in each weight class for the snatch lift, clean and jerk lift, and the total for both lifts by the Federación Salvadorena de Levantamiento de Pesas.

Current records

Men

Women

Historical records

Men (1998–2018)

Women (1998–2018)

References

El Salvador
Olympic weightlifting
records
weightlifting